Simon Tait (born 31 October 1932) is a British sailor who competed in the 1972 Summer Olympics.

References

1932 births
Living people
British male sailors (sport)
Olympic sailors of Great Britain
Sailors at the 1972 Summer Olympics – Dragon